Valborg Lindahl was a Swedish figure skater who competed both in ladies' singles and in pair skating.

With partner Nils Rosenius, she won the silver medal at the 1909 World Figure Skating Championships.

Competitive highlights

Ladies

Pairs 
With  Nils Rosenius

References 

Swedish female pair skaters
Swedish female single skaters
Date of birth missing
Date of death missing